The J-class trams were built as replacements for the King Street to Ocean Street, Edgecliff cable line designed to provide a frequent schedule, but with a lower seating capacity. Some briefly operated on the Manly lines in 1911. Withdrawals commenced in 1934 with the entry of the R Class trams, with all out of service by 1936.

Preservation
One example has been preserved:
675 at the Sydney Tramway Museum

References

Further reading

External links

Trams in Sydney
Tram vehicles of Australia